Democratic Choice (Spanish: Opción Democrática or OD) is a centre-left political party founded in 2015 by Minou Tavárez Mirabal  and other volunteers in the Dominican Republic.

History 

Democratic Choice (OD) was announced as a result of Mirabal's split from the Dominican Liberation’s Party in a public letter to the media.

Definitions 
Democratic Choice welcomes a community of Dominican citizens without restrictions based on socioeconomic status, religious beliefs, ethnicity, gender, or any other condition. The party mandate is the construction of an able democratic society to exhibit humanity's highest aspirations and to satisfy the spiritual needs and materials of the Dominican people in a surrounding of fraternity, freedom, and justice.

Symbolism 
The symbol of the party is a flower made up of the letters O and D.

The party colors are blue, yellow, green and red.

References

External links 

Political parties in the Dominican Republic
Feminist parties in North America
Social democratic parties in South America
Democratic socialist parties in North America
Feminist organizations in the Dominican Republic
Social democratic parties
Progressive parties
Green political parties
Feminist parties
Democratic socialist parties